The 1895 population census in Bosnia and Herzegovina was the third census of the population of Bosnia and Herzegovina taken during the Austro-Hungarian occupation

Results 

The number of inhabitants: 1,568,092
Population density: 30,6 per km²

Overall

References 

Censuses in Bosnia and Herzegovina
1895 in Austria-Hungary
Austro-Hungarian rule in Bosnia and Herzegovina
Bosnia